Phalaenopsis doweryensis is a species of orchid native to Borneo.

Description
This species of epiphytic, short-stemmed orchid has usually two fleshy, ovate-elliptic, obtuse leaves of variable sizes. Fleshy flowers with a greenish yellow ground colour and brown spotting are produced on erect, axillary racemes, which may reach lengths of 20 cm, but are usually shorter than the leaves. The specific epithet doweryensis refers to the Dowery Orchid Nursery, from which the type specimen was acquired, which was collected from the wild in Sabah, East Malaysia.

Taxonomy
This species is placed within the subgenus Polychilos in the section Amboinenses. It is suspected of being a hybrid of Phalaenopsis gigantea and Phalaenopsis cochlearis or Phalaenopsis kunstleri. Alternatively, it has also been concluded on the basis of morphological and genetic evidence, that this species is a hybrid of Phalaenopsis gigantea and Phalaenopsis fuscata.

Conservation
This species is protected unter the CITES appendix II regulations of international trade.

References

doweryensis
Orchids of Indonesia
Orchids of Malaysia
Orchids of Borneo
Plants described in 2001